WNKI (106.1 FM, "Wink 106") is a radio station broadcasting a Top 40 (CHR) format. Licensed to Corning, New York, United States, the station serves the Elmira-Corning area, and is the Arbitron #1 rated station in the market. The station is currently owned by Seven Mountains Media, which closed on its $3.9 million acquisition of the station April 1, 2019, from Community Broadcasters, LLC.

History
The station went on the air as WKNP in 1947, under the ownership of the Corning Leader newspaper. Its original frequency was 95.1 FM. By 1950, it had moved to another frequency, the current 106.1 FM. A sister AM station, WCLI, signed on in 1947.

It had broadcast from a building at Erie Avenue (now Dennison Parkway) and Walnut Street in Corning. The Erie Railroad mainline passed nearby, and passing freight and passenger trains used to shake the building along with the recorded music on the turntables, according to Leader columnist Dick Peer. Disc jockey Bob Shaddock, who became one of the market's iconic radio personalities, developed a skill of picking up the needle from the 78 RPM records and making announcements while trains passed, according to Peer.

The newspaper sold the stations in 1953 to Radio Corning Inc. owned by Gordon Jenkins. WCLI duplicated much of the programming of 1450 WCLI. In May 1979, Jack King purchased Radio Corning Inc. and on October 20, 1980, the station changed its call sign to WZKZ. Known as KZ-106, the station played a live-assist automated adult contemporary format. It was the top-rated station in the Elmira-Corning market for much of the decade.

In 1993, Pro Radio Inc. bought the stations. The FM call letters were switched on Oct. 8, 1993, to the current WNKI  The change was controversial in that several popular personalities were let go as Pro Radio launched a top 40 format under the name of Wink 106 with a staff of air personalities, who were popular on other stations in the market. The change made some unwanted headlines when a presumably irate listener entered the main office (then at 99 W. First St.) after hours and doused it with fox urine. The KZ brand, WZKZ call sign and country format would move west to Alfred, New York, where it would remain from 1999 to 2021.

In 1995, Pro Radio sold to Corning Sabrecom (part of Sabre Communications) for $1.85 Million which moved the stations to Elmira Heights. In 1997, the AM and FM split, with Sabre Communications selling WCLI to Eolin Broadcasting, which also owned WCBA, WCBA-FM, and WGMM.

On May 6, 2013, it was announced that Backyard Broadcasting was selling the Elmira/Corning and Olean, NY clusters, including WNKI/WPGI/WNGZ/WRCE/WWLZ, to Community Broadcasters, LLC in Watertown, New York. The sale was consummated on August 26, 2013 at a price of $3.6 million.

According to Radio + Television Business Report at RBR.com, Seven Mountains Media acquired WNKI in January 2019 along with other stations.
CORNING-ELMIRA, N.Y.: CHR/Pop Class B WNKI-FM 106.1 “Wink 106”, Rock Class A WNGZ-FM “Wingz 104.9”, licensed to Mountour Falls, N.Y., Country Class A WPGI-FM 100.9, in Horseheads, N.Y., News/Talk Class B WWLZ-AM 820, in Horseheads, N.Y., Classic Country Class C WRCE-AM 1490 in Watkins Glen, N.Y. and FM translator W267CJ at 101.3 MHz in Horseheads, N.Y.
OLEAN, N.Y.* Country Class B WPIG-FM 95.7* and WHDL-AM 1450, which uses W296DB to broadcast as CHR/Pop “Hot 107.1,” mirrored after co-owned Wink 106

Weekdays
6am-10am - Scott and Ally in the Mornings
10am-2pm - Austyn
2pm-7pm - Matt
7pm-12am - Pop Crush Nights with Kayla Thomas

Weekends
 AT40 with Ryan Seacrest- Saturday Mornings
 Most Requested Live - Saturday Nights
 Wink 106 After Party - Sunday's After Most Requested Live
Throwback 2K With Chris Cruise - Sunday Mornings
 Weekend Throwdown With Jagger - Sunday Nights

References

External links

NKI
Radio stations established in 1980
Contemporary hit radio stations in the United States